"Waters of Nazareth" is a song by French electronic music duo Justice. It was released as their debut single on 14 September 2005. It was released as a 12" and CD single with the original three songs. A 12" with remixes by DJ Funk, Erol Alkan, and Justice featuring Feadz was also released.

Background 
"Waters of Nazareth" is the debut single from the band. The single also included "Carpates" and a demo version of "Let There Be Light". The title track and a polished version of "Let There Be Light" would later be included on their 2007 debut album, †.

In popular culture  
The song is featured on the ElectroChoc radio station on Grand Theft Auto IV. It was played in episode 5 of series 13 of Top Gear, when Jeremy Clarkson, Richard Hammond and James May drove three cheap rear wheel drive cars in an ice race in France. "Waters of Nazareth" also appears in Travis Rice's critically acclaimed snowboard film That's It, That's All, as well as in the 2016 film War Dogs. The song is featured in the reveal trailer for NHL 22. The song is also featured, although fused with "War" by Edwin Starr, in DJ Hero 2.

Track listing

Charts

References

External links
 (first master)
 (second master)

2005 debut singles
Justice (band) songs
2005 songs